Niles Township is one of twelve townships in Floyd County, Iowa, USA.  As of the 2000 census, its population was 533.

Geography
According to the United States Census Bureau, Niles Township covers an area of 34.6 square miles (89.62 square kilometers).

Cities, towns, villages
 Colwell

Unincorporated towns
 Doubleday at 
 Nilesville at 
(This list is based on USGS data and may include former settlements.)

Adjacent townships
 Deerfield Township, Chickasaw County (east)
 Chickasaw Township, Chickasaw County (southeast)
 Saint Charles Township (southwest)
 Floyd Township (west)
 Cedar Township (northwest)

Cemeteries
The township contains Beckwith Cemetery.

Landmarks
 Colwell County Park

School districts
 Charles City Community School District

Political districts
 Iowa's 4th congressional district
 State House District 14
 State Senate District 7

References
 United States Census Bureau 2008 TIGER/Line Shapefiles
 United States Board on Geographic Names (GNIS)
 United States National Atlas

External links
 US-Counties.com
 City-Data.com

Townships in Floyd County, Iowa
Townships in Iowa